Ngamring County is a county of Xigazê in the Tibet Autonomous Region. "Ngamring County, sometimes referred to as the gateway to Mount Kailash and Far West Tibet, is the barren area which divides the Raga Tsangpo and the Brahmaputra."

Towns and townships

 Gegang Town 
 Sangsang Town
 Yagmo Township
 Dagyu Township
 Qu'og Township
 Kairag Township
 Dobê Township
 Riwoqê Township
 Xungba Township
 Cazê Township
 Amxung Township
 Rusar Township
 Kunglung Township
 Nyigo Township
 Comë Township
 Darog Township
 Goin'gyibug Township

Landmarks and monasteries 
The Chung Riwoche Stupa is located on the north bank of the Brahmaputra. "A narrow iron bridge spans the river here, alongside an original iron-chain footbridge attributed to Tangtong Gyelpo," the founder of Tibetan opera, who was born in Ngamring County. "Legend has it that the iron chain bridge over the Xiongqoi River ... was built with funds collected by Tongdong Gyaibo through performances."

Another point of interest is the Ralung Chutse hot spring, which has camping and a guest house.

Zangzang Lhadrak Cave in Ngamring County was where Padmasambhava hid the "Northern Treasures," which consisted of "a number of texts and various sacred objects in a maroon leather casket." These texts and objects were removed in 1366 by Vidyadhara Gödem, and became known as the Dzö Nga (mdzod lnga) or Five Treasuries. The "Northern Treasures" were taught at the Dorje Drak Monastery, and include the Künzang Gongpa Zangtha teachings, a collection of Dzogchen instructions.

Ngamring Monastery  or Ngamring Chöde (Wylie: ngam ring chos sde ) produced many important scholars. It was founded in 1225 as a Sakya monastery when "the Ngamring ruler Drakpa Dar (Grags pa dar), also known as Yöntsun (Yon btsun), invited the Sakya master Shākya Sengé (Shākya seng ge) to Ngamring and founded the monastery there."
It was later expanded by the governor Tai En Namkha Tenpa (Ta'i dben Nam mkha' brtan pa, b. 1316) with the assistance of his teacher, the Omniscient Dolpopa Sherab Gyaltsen (Dol po pa Shes rab rgyal mtshan, 1292-1361).
The monastery also followed the Jonang and Bodongpa traditions. It became a Gelugpa monastery at the time of the 5th Dalai Lama. "Tangtong Gyalpo's teacher Ka Ngapa Paljor Sherab (Bka' lnga pa Dpal 'byor shes rab) was the ninth abbot."

Transport 
China National Highway 219

See also 
Thang Tong Gyalpo (1385–1464 or 1361–1485), builder of iron bridges and father of Tibetan opera

References

External links 
Map of locations in Namling County, China Tibet Information Center

Counties of Tibet
Shigatse